The Roman Catholic Diocese of Tombura-Yambio is a diocese located in the cities of Tumbura and Yambio in the Ecclesiastical province of Juba in South Sudan.

History
 March 3, 1949: Established as Apostolic Prefecture of Mupoi from Apostolic Prefecture of Bahr el-Gebel and Apostolic Vicariate of Bahr el-Ghazal 
 December 12, 1974: Promoted as Diocese of Tombura 
 February 21, 1986: Renamed as Diocese of Tombura–Yambio

Leadership
 Prefect Apostolic of Mupoi (Roman rite) 
 Bishop Domenico Ferrara, M.C.C.I. (1949.03.11 – 1973.04.18)
 Bishop of Tombura (Roman rite) 
 Bishop Joseph Abangite Gasi (1974.12.12 – 1986.02.21 see below)
 Bishops of Tombura-Yambio (Roman rite)
 Bishop Joseph Abangite Gasi (see above 1986.02.21 - 2008.04.19)
 Bishop Edward Hiiboro Kussala (since 2008.04.19)

See also
Roman Catholicism in South Sudan

Sources
 GCatholic.org
 Diocese of Tombura-Yambio website 

Tombura-Yambio
Christian organizations established in 1949
Roman Catholic dioceses and prelatures established in the 20th century
1949 establishments in Sudan